Geert Broeckaert (born 15 November 1960) is a former Belgian professional football player and a football coach.

Career
Broeckaert was a youth product of AA Gent, but at the age of 17 he moved to Cercle Brugge after his father had bought off his contract. He would eventually stay 13 years in Bruges and play 375 matches for the green and black team, the second most someone ever has played for Cercle. Jules Verriest holds this record with 492 matches played. Broeckaert also won the Cercle Brugge Pop Poll 3 times. This is a record he shares with Morten Olsen, Josip Weber and Yves Feys.

Position
He used to be a technically strong midfielder.

International career
In 1990, Geert Broeckaert played his only match for Belgium, a 0-2 loss against East Germany. This also was the last match ever the national football team of East Germany would play.

Coaching career
In 1991, Broeckaert moved to Exc. Mouscron, where he was manager, assistant manager and youth coach. Due to the financial uncertainty at Mouscron, Broeckaert signed for RAEC Mons, to become assistant manager for Rudy Cossey. Franky Vandendriessche made this same move only a bit earlier.

References

 Cerclemuseum.be

External links
 

Living people
1960 births
Belgian footballers
K.A.A. Gent players
Cercle Brugge K.S.V. players
Royal Excel Mouscron players
Belgium international footballers
Belgian football managers
Royal Excel Mouscron managers
Belgian Pro League players
People from Zottegem
Footballers from East Flanders
Association football midfielders